Psiloibidion is a genus of beetles in the family Cerambycidae, containing the following species:

 Psiloibidion boteroi Garcia, 2019
 Psiloibidion leucogramma (Perty, 1832)

References

Ibidionini